Nyakosoba is a community council located in the Maseru District of Lesotho. Its population in 2006 was 10,893.

Villages
The community of Nyakosoba includes the villages of:

Aupolasi
Bolatella
Ha Chalalisa
Ha Chere
Ha Choatlella
Ha Graffis
Ha Joele
Ha Jonase
Ha Kakae
Ha Khanyetsi
Ha Kubutu
Ha Kutumane
Ha Lekatanyane
Ha Lekhooa
Ha Lelao
Ha Lepeli
Ha Leronti
Ha Leteba
Ha Letebele
Ha Mabobola
Ha Macheli
Ha Mahleke
Ha Makafane
Ha Maoela
Ha Masireletse
Ha Mathibeli
Ha Mofutisi
Ha Mohlachane
Ha Mojela
Ha Moleko
Ha Molibetsane
Ha Moloi
Ha Monyane
Ha Motsie
Ha Mpota
Ha Nchakha
Ha Ngaka
Ha Nkoankoa
Ha Ntahli
Ha Ntai
Ha Ntlale
Ha Ntsane
Ha Ntsane (Lekhalong)
Ha Penane
Ha Petso (Furumela)
Ha Pitso
Ha Qhomoqo
Ha Ralitseko
Ha Ramothibeli
Ha Rasemousu
Ha Sakia
Ha Sebili
Ha Sempe
Ha Sephali
Ha Setefane
Ha Suoane
Ha Thabo
Ha Thakeli
Ha Tseko
Ha Tšomo
Hloahloeng
Kanana
Khubetsoana
Khumamela
Koeneng
Koung
Likhalaneng
Likhutlong
Likoaring
Likolobeng
Litenteng
Litšaneng
Mantšatlala
Maphakatlaling
Masaleng
Mathuleng
Mekhukhung
Ngope-Tšoeu
Nyakosoba
Pheuoeng
Qiloane
Terai Hoek
Thota-Peli
Tiping
Titimaneng
Tšana-Talana
Tšoeneng

References

External links
 Google map of community villages

Populated places in Maseru District